John Cock (by 1506 – 6 September 1557), of London and Broxbourne, Hertfordshire, was an English politician.

He was the son of William Cock of Broxbourne and studied law at the Inner Temple.

He was attorney-general to the Duchy of Cornwall from 1532 to his death. He sat on the bench for Hertfordshire as a Justice of the Peace from 1540, probably to his death. He was attorney to Queen Catherine Parr in 1543 and was High Sheriff of Essex and Hertfordshire for 1548–49. He was Master of Requests for 1550–1553 and a Privy Councillor in March 1552.

He was elected a Member (MP) of the Parliament of England for Hertfordshire in 1545, 1547, March 1533, April 1554, November 1554 and 1555 and for Calne in 1547.

He married Anne, the daughter of Thomas Goodere of Hadley, Hertfordshire and had 3 sons and 2 daughters. He was succeeded by his son Henry.

References

 

1557 deaths
People from Broxbourne
Members of the Parliament of England for Hertfordshire
Members of the Inner Temple
English MPs 1545–1547
English MPs 1547–1552
English MPs 1553 (Edward VI)
English MPs 1554
English MPs 1554–1555
English MPs 1555
High Sheriffs of Essex
High Sheriffs of Hertfordshire
Members of the Privy Council of England
Year of birth uncertain